The 2019 Lotto Belgium Tour  is the seventh edition of the Lotto Belgium Tour, previous called Lotto-Decca Tour, a women's cycle stage race in Belgium. The tour has an UCI rating of 2.1.

Stages

Classification leadership

See also

2019 in women's road cycling

References

External links

Lotto Belgium Tour
Lotto Belgium Tour
Lotto-Decca Tour